SpaceX CRS-10, also known as SpX-10, was a Dragon Commercial Resupply Service mission to the International Space Station (ISS) which launched on 19 February 2017. The mission was contracted by NASA as part of its Commercial Resupply Services program and was launched by SpaceX aboard the 30th flight of the Falcon 9 rocket. The mission ended on 19 March 2017 when the Dragon spacecraft left the ISS and safely returned to Earth.

Operations history
CRS-10 is part of the original order of twelve missions awarded to SpaceX under the Commercial Resupply Services contract. In June 2016, a NASA Inspector General report had this mission manifested for November 2016. The launch was then put on hold pending investigation of the pad explosion in September 2016, with a tentative date no earlier than January 2017, subsequently set for 18 February.

On 12 February 2017, SpaceX successfully completed a static fire test of the Falcon 9 engines on Pad 39A. An initial launch attempt on 18 February 2017 was scrubbed 13 seconds before its 15:01:32 UTC launch due to a thrust vector control system issue in the rocket's second stage, resulting in a 24-hour hold for launch no earlier than 19 February at 14:39 UTC. The faulty actuator was repaired at the launch pad overnight, and the rocket was returned to vertical approximately six hours before the scheduled launch time.

CRS-10 was launched from Kennedy Space Center Launch Complex 39 Pad A on 19 February 2017 at 14:39 UTC, the first launch from the complex since STS-135 on 8 July 2011, the last flight of the Space Shuttle program, and the first uncrewed mission from the site since the launch of the Skylab space station on 14 May 1973; this complex is also where the Apollo missions were launched.

Following the successful launch, the first stage proceeded through a three-burn flyback and landed safely in Landing Zone 1, the first daytime landing of a Falcon rocket on land.

The Dragon spacecraft rendezvoused with the International Space Station on 22 February, but its approach was automatically aborted by an on-board computer at 08:25 UTC when a data error was reported in its navigation system. This is the first rendezvous abort by a Dragon spacecraft. The problem was traced to an incorrect data value in the spacecraft's Global Positioning System, critical to operations as this data informs the vehicle of its relative position to the space station. The abort resulted in a 24-hour hold on its approach. The error was corrected in this time, during which the spacecraft entered a "racetrack" trajectory around the station to reset its approach. An error-free second attempt resulted in Dragon being captured by the station's Canadarm2 on 23 February at 10:44 UTC, with berthing to the Harmony module taking place a few hours later at 13:12 UTC. This abort was later revealed in a NASA Inspector General audit to have resulted from incompatibilities between NASA's and SpaceX's software development processes.

The CRS-10 mission ended on 19 March 2017. The Dragon spacecraft was detached from the International Space Station by Canadarm2 on 18 March 2017 at 21:20 UTC, moved to a stow position below the station where it stayed overnight, and was released at 09:11 UTC. Dragon performed three departure burns to move it away from the station before conducting a final de-orbit burn at around 14:00 UTC.

Dragon returned  of material from the ISS, including research samples, science and crew equipment, and spacewalking hardware.

Primary payload
NASA contracted the CRS-10 mission from SpaceX and therefore determined the primary payload, date/time of launch, and orbital parameters for the Dragon space capsule. External payloads on the CRS-10 spacecraft are the SAGE III Earth observation experiment and its Nadir Viewing Platform (NVP), and the U.S. Department of Defense's Space Test Program Houston 5 (STP-H5) package including the Raven navigation investigation and the Lightning Imaging Sensor. Some science payloads include ACME, LMM Biophysics, ZBOT, and CIR/Cool Flames.

The following is a breakdown of cargo bound for the ISS:
 Science investigations: 
 Crew supplies: 
 Vehicle hardware: 
 Spacewalk equipment: 
 Computer resources: 
 Russian hardware: 
 External payloads:
 SAGE-III: 
 STP-H5:

Trial of new flight safety system
SpaceX's CRS-10 launch was the "first operational use" of the Autonomous Flight Safety System (AFSS) on "either of Air Force Space Command Eastern or Western Ranges."  AFSS is replacing "the ground-based mission flight control personnel and equipment with on-board Positioning, Navigation and Timing sources and decision logic.  The benefits of AFSS include increased public safety, reduced reliance on range infrastructure, reduced range spacelift cost, increased schedule predictability and availability, operational flexibility, and launch slot flexibility." The system consists of software developed by NASA, the Air Force, and DARPA, to which SpaceX adds an additional software layer customized for its rocket. AFSS has flown on 13 previous Falcon 9 missions in a so-called "shadow mode" for testing.

See also

 Uncrewed spaceflights to the International Space Station
 List of Falcon 9 and Falcon Heavy launches

References

External links
 
 Dragon website at SpaceX.com
 Commercial Resupply Services at NASA.gov

SpaceX Dragon
Spacecraft launched in 2017
Spacecraft which reentered in 2017
SpaceX payloads contracted by NASA
Supply vehicles for the International Space Station